Signore is a village in the north-eastern part of Indian state of Rajasthan. It is the Udaipurwati tehsil of Jhunjhunu District.

Demographics 
According to the 2011 population census the village has 5674 people. Out of those 2857 are male and 2817 are females.

Administration 
Singnore village is a village panchayat in which Majhau and Dhani-Majhau are two revenue villages.

Religion 
Mataji temple is in Singnore village. Kalika Mata and Thakurji temples are in Majhau. A Shiva temple and a Gogaji temple are in Dhani Majhau. Jeen Mata Mandir is in Godara Ka Bass Singnor. The jeen mata mandir was renovated in 2017. A temple of Gogaji is in Godara Ki Dhani Singnor.

Economy 
The highway from Nawalgarh originates from the main market.

References 

Villages in Jhunjhunu district